Favartia kalafuti is a species of sea snail, a marine gastropod mollusk in the family Muricidae, the murex snails or rock snails.

Description
Original description: "Shell small for genus, fusiform, with elevated spire; 6 varices per whorl; shoulder sharp-angled; body whorl with 5 large cords; cords end in thick, blunt spines at intersections with varix; cords minutely fimbriated; varices heavily fimbriated; shell grayish-white with 2 wide, dark brown bands, one around mid-body and one around siphonal canal; suture marked with row of intermittent dark brown patches; siphonal canal with 2 large cords, producing 2 large spines at intersection with  varix; aperture ovate, large in proportion to shell size; dark mid-body band showing through in aperture."

Distribution
Locus typicus: "(Dredged from) 150 metres depth
50 kilometres South of Apalachicola, Florida, USA."

References

Muricidae
Gastropods described in 1987